The 2012 Euroleague Final Four was the concluding EuroLeague Final Four tournament of the 2011–12 Euroleague season. It was held on May 11–13, 2012. The tournament was hosted at the Sinan Erdem Dome, in Istanbul, Turkey. Olympiacos won its second ever EuroLeague championship, after beating CSKA Moscow in the Final.

In the Final, Georgios Printezis hit a floater with 0.7 seconds remaining on the game clock, after receiving an assist from Vassilis Spanoulis, to win the EuroLeague cup. Spanoulis won his second Final Four MVP after the tournament.

Venue 
On May 8, 2011, Euroleague Basketball announced that the Final Four would be held at the Sinan Erdem Dome, in Istanbul. It has a seating capacity of 22,500 for concerts, and 16,000 for the sport of basketball, making it Turkey's largest multi-purpose indoor venue, and the third largest in Europe (although it is not the third largest in Europe in capacity for basketball use). The arena is named after Sinan Erdem (1927–2003), who was the President of the Turkish Olympic Committee, from 1989, until his death in 2003.

Bracket 
All times are CEST (UTC+2).

Semifinal 1

Semifinal 2

Third-place game

Championship game

References

External links 
Official Site

Final Four
2012
International basketball competitions hosted by Turkey
2012
2011–12 in Turkish basketball
2011–12 in Spanish basketball
2011–12 in Greek basketball
2011–12 in Russian basketball
Sport in Bakırköy